Vicente Mut i Armengol (1614–1687) was a Mallorcan astronomer, engineer, historian, mathematician and soldier.

He was born at Palma in 1614, and became a major of his island militia, a mathematician and historian. He wrote several publications on artillery, astronomy and history, and worked on the fortification of Mallorca.

Mutus crater on the Moon is
named in his honor.

External links 
Vicente Mut Armengol. Polymath Virtual Library, Fundación Ignacio Larramendi

References

1614 births
1687 deaths
17th-century Spanish astronomers
People from Mallorca